Halim or Haleem  is an Arabic masculine given name which means gentle, forbearing, mild, patient, understanding, indulgent, slow to anger, "what we call a civilized man".

In Islam, Al-Halīm is one of the 99 names of God, with that meaning. 

Abdul Halim or Abdel Halim means servant of God, as thus described, and bearers of that name are listed on that page.

Halim is also a Chinese Indonesian surname based on Lim (林).

Given name 
Halim is also used as an abbreviated version of Abdul Halim, or independently, as a name given to a male. Examples of that are:
 Halim Bukhari, Bangladeshi Deobandi scholar
 Halim Barakat, Syrian novelist
 Halim Benmabrouk, Algerian footballer
 Haleem Brohi, Pakistani author
 Haleem Chaudhri, Bengali cricketer
 Halim El-Dabh, American composer
 Halim Haryanto, Indonesian / American badminton player
 Halim Perdanakusuma, Indonesian aviator and national hero, after whom Halim Perdanakusuma International Airport is named
 Halim Medaci, Algerian footballer
 Said Halim Pasha, Ottoman Empire Grand Vizier
 Halim Saad, Malaysian businessman

Surname 
Halim may also be a last name:
 Aamer Haleem, Canadian radio and television personality
 Helmy Halim, Egyptian filmmaker
 Melanie Fiona Hallim, Canadian-Guyanese singer
 Mohammad Haleem, Pakistani judge
 Mustafa Ben Halim (1921–2021), ex-Prime Minister of Libya
 Natasha Mannuela Halim, Miss World Indonesia 2016
 Rachman Halim, Indonesian businessman

See also 
 Lim (surname)

References 

Arabic masculine given names
Bosniak masculine given names
Bosnian masculine given names